Sempronius Gracchus was a Roman nobleman who seduced Julia the Elder when she was wife of Marcus Agrippa; this led to a long-term affair. Gracchus was involved in an intrigue with the imperial family of Augustus by which he sought to undermine the position of Tiberius. He was married to a woman called Alliaria. His affair was discovered by Augustus who banished him to Cercina (Kerkennah Islands) where he endured an exile of fourteen years. Most probably he was executed in AD 14 on the orders of Tiberius after his accession. A character by this name is played by Charles Laughton in the 1960 Stanley Kubrick epic film Spartacus.

Notes

1st-century BC births
14 deaths
1st-century BC Romans
1st-century Romans
Sempronii
Executed ancient Roman people
People executed by the Roman Empire
Ancient Roman exiles
Male lovers of royalty
Lovers of Roman royalty